Project A may refer to:

Project A (film), 1983 martial arts action-comedy film
Project Alberta, also known as Project A, a section of the Manhattan Project
Valorant, a video game previously billed as Project A